Saint Sabinus of Spoleto (died c. 303) was a bishop in the early Christian church who resisted the Diocletianic Persecution and was martyred.

Traditional narrative
According to legend, Venustian, governor of Etruria and Umbria, had Sabinus and his deacons arrested in Assisi. Diocletian's order required all Christians to sacrifice to the Roman gods or be put to death; their estates were then to be seized for the state. 

Venustian mocked Sabinus's faith, accusing him of leading the people to the worship of a dead man. When Sabinus said that Christ rose on the third day, Venustian invited him to do the same thing. The deacons were in great fear, but Sabinus encouraged them to hold to their faith, and they died after being torn apart by iron hooks. Venustian had Sabinus's hands cut off. 

In prison after the martyrdom of his deacons, he was tended by a woman named Serena.  While in prison, he healed a man born blind. Venustian heard of the cure and sought a cure for his own eyes from Sabinus. Sabinus healed the governor and converted him to Christianity.  Venustian then sheltered Sabinus. Maximianus Herculius, hearing of this, ordered the tribune Lucius to address the matter. Lucius had Venustian, his wife, and his two sons beheaded at Assisi, and he had Sabinus beaten to death at Spoleto.

Veneration
Sabinus's feast day is 30 December in the Eastern Orthodox Church and in the Roman Martyrology of the Catholic Church.

He is depicted in the Maestà of Duccio.

The church of San Sabino, dedicated to the saint, is outside Spoleto.

Other saints of the name
The Roman Martyrology lists six saints called Sabinus, three of whom were bishops. The other two are Sabinus of Canossa (died ; feast day, 9 February) and Sabinus of Piacenza (died late 4th century; feast day, 11 December).

Notes

References

Bibliography

Englebert, Omer.  "The Lives of the Saints."  Anne and Christopher Fremantle, trans.  Nihil obstat 1954.  New York: Barnes & Noble, 1994, p. 494-495

External links

St. Sabinus

3rd-century births
300 deaths
Italian saints
3rd-century Christian martyrs
3rd-century Romans
Christians martyred during the reign of Diocletian